The 378th Fighter Squadron is an active duty fighter squadron in the United States Air Force whose mission is to fly, maintain and support F-15C, F-16, and F-35 aircraft.  It is assigned to the 495th Fighter Group, Headquarters Fifteenth Air Force, of Air Combat Command stationed at Dane County Regional Airport-Truax Field, Wisconsin.  While headquartered out of the 115th Fighter Wing, the unit has five additional operating locations, which are geographically separated across six Air National Guard Fighters Wings.  It was last activated on 8 November 2015.

History
Established on 1 March 1943 at Westover Field, Massachusetts as the 362d Fighter Group, equipped with P-47 Thunderbolts. Deployed to the European Theater of Operations (ETO), and assigned to Ninth Air Force in England. Engaged in combat operations until May 1945.

Reassigned back to the United States in August–September 1945, and assigned to First Air Force at Seymour Johnson Field, North Carolina, being programmed for deployment to Okinawa to take part in the planned Invasion of Japan. As a result of the Atomic bombings of Hiroshima and Nagasaki and the sudden end of the Pacific War, the deployment plans were canceled, however the unit was retained as part of the Second Air Force under Continental Air Forces and reassigned to Biggs Field, Texas, being equipped with P-51 Mustangs. Inactivated on 1 August due to postwar budget restrictions.

Active Associate Unit 
In 2008, Air Force leadership recognized that the changing force structure demanded creative ways to generate experienced fighter pilots. The solution was to capitalize on the experience and assets of the Guard and Reserve. This Total Force Integration initiative became Active Association, whereby Regular Air Force personnel work side-by-side with host Air Reserve and Air National Guard Component units in a mutually beneficial relationship.  Total Force Integration is a vital enterprise aimed at maximizing the combined contributions of the Active and Reserve components, while ensuring "right-sizing" of component mix.  The 378th Fighter Squadron will continue to lead the Air Force's pilot absorption efforts and the partnerships will allow active-duty and Air National Guard fighter units to share resources, reduce duplications of effort, and ultimately, increase the Air Force's overall air defense capabilities in order to enhance the ability to provide dominant combat airpower for America.

Lineage
 Constituted 378th Fighter Squadron on 11 February 1943
 Activated on 1 March 1943
 Inactivated on 1 August 1946
 Activated on 8 November 2015

Assignments
 362d Fighter Group, 1 March 1943 – 1 August 1946
 495th Fighter Group, 8 November 2015

Stations

 Westover Field, Massachusetts, 1 March 1943
 Bradley Field, Connecticut, 22 June 1943
 Groton Field, Connecticut, 2 August 1943
 Mitchel Field, New York, 19 October – 12 November 1943
 RAF Wormingford (AAF-159), England, 30 November 1943
 RAF Headcorn (AAF-412), England, 13 April 1944
 Lignerolles Airfield (A-12), France, 2 July 1944
 Rennes/St-Jacques Airfield (A-27), France, 10 August 1944

 Prosnes Airfield (A-79), France, 19 September 1944
 Verdun Airfield (A-82), France, 5 November 1944
 Frankfurt/Rhine-Main Airfield (Y-73), Germany, 8 April 1945
 Furth/Industriehafen Airfield (R-30), Germany, 30 April 1945
 Illesheim Airfield (R-10), Germany, 3 May 1945
 AAF Station Straubing, Germany, 12 May–August 1945
 Seymour Johnson Field, North Carolina, 5 September 1945
 Biggs Field, Texas, 3 December 1945 – 1 August 1946.
 Truax Field, Wisconsin, 8 November 2015 - Present

Integrated Units 

 112th Fighter Squadron (F-16 Fighting Falcon)
 180th Fighter Wing located at Toledo Air National Guard Base, Toledo, Oregon
 123rd Fighter Squadron (F-15C Eagle)
 142nd Fighter Wing located at Portland Air National Guard Base, Portland, Oregon
 175th Fighter Squadron (F-16 Fighting Falcon)
 114th Fighter Wing located at Joe Foss Field Air National Guard Station, Sioux Falls, South Dakota
 176th Fighter Squadron (F-35 Lightning II)
 115th Fighter Wing located at Truax Field Air National Guard Base, Madison, Wisconsin
 179th Fighter Squadron (F-16 Fighting Falcon)
 148th Fighter Wing located at Duluth Air National Guard Base, Duluth, Minnesota
 194th Fighter Squadron (F-15C Eagle)
 144th Fighter Wing located at Fresno Air National Guard Base, Fresno, California
 115th Medical Group
 115th Maintenance Group
 115th Aircraft Maintenance Squadron
 115th Maintenance Squadron
 115th Operations Support Squadron 
 115th Logistics Readiness Squadron

Aircraft
 P-47D Thunderbolt, 1943–1945
 P-51H Mustang, 1945–1946
 F-15 Eagle, 2015-Present
 F-16 Fighting Falcon, 2015-Present
 F-35 Lightning II, 2022-Present

References

 

Fighter squadrons of the United States Army Air Forces